The 2010 Kremlin Cup was a tennis tournament played on indoor hard courts. It was the 21st edition of the Kremlin Cup for the men (15th edition for the women) and was part of the ATP World Tour 250 Series of the 2010 ATP World Tour, and of the Premier Series of the 2010 WTA Tour. It was held at the Olympic Stadium in Moscow, Russia, from 18 October through 24 October 2010. Viktor Troicki and Victoria Azarenka won the singles title.

ATP entrants

Seeds

 Seeds are based on the rankings of October 11, 2010

Other entrants
The following players received wildcards into the singles main draw:
  Igor Andreev
  Teymuraz Gabashvili
  Dmitry Tursunov

The following players received entry from the qualifying draw:
  Ilya Belyaev
  Victor Crivoi
  Igor Kunitsyn
  Andrey Kuznetsov

The following player received entry as a Lucky loser into the singles main draw:
  Paul-Henri Mathieu

WTA entrants

Seeds

 Seeds are based on the rankings of October 11, 2010

Other entrants
The following players received wildcards into the singles main draw:
  Daria Gavrilova
  Alla Kudryavtseva
  Li Na

The following players received entry from the qualifying draw:
  Zarina Diyas
  Mariya Koryttseva 
  Ksenia Pervak
  Olga Savchuk

Finals

Men's singles

 Viktor Troicki defeated  Marcos Baghdatis, 3–6, 6–4, 6–3.
It was Troicki's first career title.

Women's singles

 Victoria Azarenka defeated  Maria Kirilenko, 6–3, 6–4.
It was Azarenka's second title of the year, and the fifth of her career.

Men's doubles

 Igor Kunitsyn /  Dmitry Tursunov  defeated  Janko Tipsarević /  Viktor Troicki, 7–6(10–8), 6–3.

Women's doubles

 Gisela Dulko /  Flavia Pennetta defeated  Sara Errani /  María José Martínez Sánchez, 6–3, 2–6, [10–6].

External links
 Official website

Kremlin Cup
Kremlin Cup
Kremlin Cup
Kremlin Cup
Kremlin Cup
Kremlin Cup